Calvin Hartwell (December 17, 1849 – May 19, 1920) was a Republican politician who served as a member of the Pasadena Board of Trustees  from 1895 to 1898, Mayor of Pasadena, California from 1896 to 1898, Los Angeles County Assessor from 1906 to 1910, and Los Angeles County Coroner from 1908 to 1920. He was born near Sandusky, Ohio. Following his death on May 19, 1920, Hartwell left his estate, which was worth over $10,000, to his wife Mary L. Hartwell.

References

External links

1920 deaths
American coroners
Mayors of Pasadena, California
1849 births
California Republicans